INC secured absolute majority in  2005 Haryana Legislative Assembly election. Bhupinder Singh Hooda was elected leader of the party in the assembly and was sworn in as Chief Minister of Haryana in March 2005. 

Here is the list of the ministers:

Chief Minister & Cabinet Ministers

References

Hooda 01
Indian National Congress state ministries
2005 in Indian politics
Indian National Congress of Haryana
2005 establishments in Haryana
2009 disestablishments in India
Cabinets established in 2005
Cabinets disestablished in 2009